Paul Stern (4 April 1892 – 12 June 1948)  was an Austrian international bridge player and lawyer, who fled to London in 1938. He was a bidding theorist and administrator who contributed to the early growth of the game. He founded the Austrian Bridge Federation in 1929, and was its first president.

According to his obituary in the Contract Bridge Journal:Paul Stern - whose "Dr." was a so inseparable part of his name that he signed the most casual post-card with the prefix - was, both in his early life and in his exile, an unforgettable figure. He was tall, burly, irascible, with a voice so rough, a temperament so volatile that half the people who saw him called him a dictator; but with a charm so great, a sweetness so unexpected that even those he castigated seldom bore malice for long.

Career in bridge 
Stern was a member of the Austria open teams who won the first two European championships, 1932 and 1933, under the auspices of the International Bridge League in Scheveningen, Netherlands, and in London. In 1935 he developed the Vienna System, or Austrian System, the first highly artificial bidding system to achieve international success. Strong hands (equivalent to about 18 or more high-card points using the now-standard Milton Work count) were opened One Notrump; most hands with 11–17 points that lacked a five card spade, heart or diamond suit were opened One Club. Many strong players adopted the Vienna System and Stern remained the leader and an important mentor. He was the  when Austria recaptured the European championships (Open category) in 1936 and 1937.

The 1937 IBL Championships doubled as the first world championship tournament, conducted June 1937 in Budapest. In the final, Austria defeated Ely Culbertson's team from the United States by 4,740 points over 96 boards, using the Vienna System against the natural Culbertson system. The result of this match caused a sensation, as did all the previous Culbertson matches. Stern's book on the championships does not mention that there were other teams in the event! The world champions were anchored by Karl Schneider and Hans Jellinek, perhaps the world's strongest pair at the time, with Karl von Blöhdorn, Dr Edward Frischauer, Walter Herbert and Udo von Meissl. (Bridge teams, or teams-of-four, commonly have six players with two on the "bench" at any time.) Culbertson traveled with four players, as usual —Ely and Josephine at one table, Helen Sobel and Charles Vogelhofer at the other— and it was widely thought at the time that this quartet was not America's best. In addition, the Culbertsons were on the verge of divorce, which cannot be good for a bridge partnership.

Austria also won the Ladies flight of the exceptional European/World championships, and thus won the first three annual Europeans for women. Decades later, Stern's protégé (Erika) Rixi Scharfstein, a member of those 1935 to 1937 champions, would win many European and world titles as Rixi Markus representing Great Britain.

According to a September 1948 article on Markus in the Contract Bridge Journal, Stern was "perhaps the greatest coach who ever lived". A dictatorial leader, Stern insisted that his players adhered with rigidity to his system, but his over-emphatic statements and instructions were tempered by an underlying warmth of personality. According to Rixi Markus's autobiography, A Vulnerable Game, Stern would hit her on the hand if she made a mistake. When training the Austrian ladies' team, if unhappy with their play he would yell "Cows!".

When Germany annexed Austria in 1938 (Anschluss), he returned his military medals, awarded in World War I and which included the Golden Merit Cross with Crown awarded for the highest level of bravery in the face of the enemy, to the Nazi authorities and included an insulting letter. As a result, he was put on a death list. He escaped to England; his wife, Martha, and two teenage children joined him shortly afterwards. He was a major bridge figure in London for the next decade, founding a school of bridge which taught his bidding system, running a weekly duplicate in Hampstead during World War II and playing rubber bridge regularly at the Hamilton Club and Lederer's. Stern became a naturalised British citizen in March 1948, a few months before his death.

He did not tolerate fools gladly at the bridge table. Once he was confronted with having thrown a cup of coffee at his partner, and said, "It was nothing serious. There was no sugar in it".

He suffered from diabetes.

Publications
 Championship der international bridge league: Wien, 7.–12 juni 1934: 1800 Spiele (45 matches à 40 Spiele) (Vienna: Stern), 199 pp. – IBL Championship 1934 – Stern with the assistance of Egon Watza and Manfred Wlaschütz. 
 Wir lizitieren ... die Ansagetechnik der Wiener Weltmeister (Vienna: Stern, 1937), 220 pp. 
 Beating the Culbertsons: how the Austrians won the world contract bridge championship; with 96 diagrams of the actual hands played and comments thereon (London: T. Werner Laurie, 1938), 128 pp.  – IBL Championship 1937
  192 pp. – "Translated with the assistance of Margery Belsey." 
  300 pp. 
  220 pp. – Assisted by Stern. 
  141 pp. 
  243 pp. – "New and complete text book."

References

External links 
 
 

1892 births
1930s missing person cases
1948 deaths
20th-century Austrian lawyers
Austrian contract bridge players
Bridge players from London
British and Irish contract bridge players
Contract bridge writers
Date of birth missing
Formerly missing people
Jewish contract bridge players
Jewish emigrants from Austria to the United Kingdom after the Anschluss
Missing person cases in Austria
Naturalised citizens of the United Kingdom
Place of birth missing
Recipients of the Iron Cross (1914)